Locust swarms have been recorded throughout history. Those which have their own Wikipedia articles are listed here, but there are many more notable ones that have happened.

References

!
Lists of natural disasters